William Beverly may refer to:

 Bill Beverly (born 1965), American crime writer
 William Roxby Beverly (1810–1889), English theatrical scene painter